Unnikannan  is the first Keralite to successfully climb Mount Everest twice. He is a native of Azhuthan Poyil Veetil from Peringome, a village near to Payyannur in Kannur district of Kerala State, India

Mount Everest missions

2012 Indian Army Women Everest Expedition
The 2012 Indian Army Women Everest Expedition  led by Lt. Colonel Ajay Kothiyal recorded a total of 28 persons reach on the summit, 15 of them was Indians and 13 sherpas. Unnikannan was a member of this expedition but did not do the summit bid,

2013 Indo Nepal Joint Army Everest Expedition(First accent)
The 2013 Indo Nepal Joint Army Everest Expedition  led by Colonel Ranveer Singh Jamwal recorded a total of 43 persons reach on the summit, 11 of them was Indians and 32 sherpas. As a member of this expedition Unnikannan climbed Mount Everest first time on 20 May 2013 with co-summitters,

2015 Indian Army Everest-Lhoste Massif Expedition 
He was a member of the 2015 Indian Army Everest-Lhoste massive Expedition. But this expedition abandoned at 6400 m due to earthquake and avalanches happened in that year in Nepal,

2016 Indian Army Everest Massif Expedition (Second accent ) 
Then in 2016 as team member of Joint Indo-Nepal Army Everest Expedition 2016 led by Colonel Ranveer Singh Jamwal he climbed Mount Everest with his team for the second time on 20 May 2016, three years to his first ascent and become the first Keralite to climb Mount Everest twice.

Other climbed peaks 
He joined the Himalayan Mountaineering Institute in Darjeeling for the basic mountaineering course, as a part of the Indian Army's Adventure Wing in 2005. His mountaineering career started from the time the course was completed. The first peak was Mount Kalindi near Badrinath (6,102 m) in 2006. He climbed the peaks of Satopanth (7075 m), Chaukhamba I (7138 m), Trisul I (7,120 m), and Friendship Manali, Himachal Pradesh (5,289), Chaukhamba I second time. During the conquest of Friendship peak, the group gained the honor of being the first group to climb that mountain in the winter.

Personal life 
He is a Naib Subedar in Indian Army. His primary education was at Peringome Higher Secondary School. Unnikannan is son K K.Padmanabhan, a farmer, and Shakunthala A. P. Veetil couple. TV. Prajisha is his wife and the couple have a daughter, Adhishree.

Notes about other Keralites on Mount Everest 
C. Balakrishnan did not do the summit who was the member of the first Indian successful Everest Expedition.
Suresh Kumar (mountaineer) a member of 1992 Indo-Tibetan Border Police Expedition to Mount Everest and 1996 Indo-Tibetan Border Police expedition to Mount Everest also did not do the summit.

See also
Indian summiters of Mount Everest - Year wise
List of Mount Everest summiters by number of times to the summit
List of Mount Everest records of India
List of Mount Everest records

References 

Indian summiters of Mount Everest
Indian mountain climbers
Living people
1983 births